The Fight: Lights Out is a 2010 action fighting video game developed by ColdWood Interactive and published by Sony Computer Entertainment for the PlayStation 3. It utilizes the PlayStation Move controllers. It was unveiled at the 2010 Game Developers Conference in San Francisco and was released in November 2010.

Gameplay
The game is presented with predominantly black-and-white graphics and bright red blood. In the game, the player takes control of a character in a one-on-one fight with another character. Players use the PlayStation Move to control characters' attacks, such as punches, jabs and uppercuts by performing the same moves in real life using the controller. There are twenty-three moves available to the player.

Reception

The Fight received "generally unfavorable reviews" according to the review aggregation website Metacritic. Joystiq said, "Take this mess of iffy hit detection and blocking, tack on perfunctory online multiplayer and a half-realized match gambling system, and you have a game ... sort of." IGN said the game was "a mess that is not only frustrating to play – it is also tiring and boring."  In Japan, Famitsu gave it a better score of two sevens, one six, and one eight for a total of 28 out of 40.

References

External links
 

2010 video games
Boxing video games
ColdWood Interactive games
Fighting games
Monochrome video games
Multiplayer and single-player video games
PlayStation 3 games
PlayStation 3-only games
PlayStation Move-compatible games
PlayStation Move-only games
Sony Interactive Entertainment games
Video games developed in Sweden
Video games with stereoscopic 3D graphics